Halococcus hamelinensis is a halophilic archaeon isolated from the stromatolites in Australia.

References

Archaea genera
Archaea described in 2006